Georg Pelisaar (born 7 December 1958 in Selise) is an Estonian journalist and politician. He was a member of the IX, X and XI Riigikogu.

He has been a member of Estonian Centre Party since 1991. On 11 May 2011, he was elected mayor of Põlva. Since 2013, he has been the mayor of Põlva Parish.

References

Living people
1958 births
Estonian journalists
Estonian Centre Party politicians
Members of the Riigikogu, 1999–2003
Members of the Riigikogu, 2003–2007
Members of the Riigikogu, 2007–2011
Mayors of places in Estonia
University of Tartu alumni
People from Setomaa Parish